Robert van der Veen (September 26, 1906 in Shanghai, Empire of China – March 18, 1996 in Jette, Belgium) was a Dutch field hockey player who competed in the 1928 Summer Olympics.

He was a member of the Dutch field hockey team, which won the silver medal. He played all four matches as forward and scored three goals.

External links
 
profile

1906 births
1996 deaths
Dutch male field hockey players
Field hockey players at the 1928 Summer Olympics
Olympic field hockey players of the Netherlands
Olympic silver medalists for the Netherlands
Olympic medalists in field hockey
Sportspeople from Shanghai
Medalists at the 1928 Summer Olympics
Dutch expatriates in China